Gretchen Kunigk Fraser (February 11, 1919 – February 17, 1994) was an American alpine ski racer. She was the first American to win an Olympic gold medal in skiing. She was also the skiing stand-in for ice skater Sonja Henie in the movies Thin Ice (1937) and Sun Valley Serenade (1941).

Background
Born in Tacoma, Washington, Gretchen Kunigk was the daughter of German and Norwegian immigrants, Willibald and Clara Kunigk.  Her Norwegian-born mother was a skier and Gretchen first skied at age 13, at Paradise Valley on the south slopes of Mount Rainier in December 1932.  Under the tutelage of Otto Lang she became a proficient ski racer and later competed on the ski team at the University of Puget Sound.

Career
In 1938, she traveled to Sun Valley to compete in the second Harriman Cup, a new international event featuring the best racers in the world.  She met 1936 Olympian and Northwest ski champion Donald Fraser (1913–1994) of the University of Washington on the train trip to central Idaho. They were married in November 1939, and Sun Valley became their home.

Both Frasers were members of the 1940 Olympic team, games that were cancelled due to World War II. She spent the war years skiing in Otto Lang's military training films and helping to rehabilitate wounded and disabled veterans through skiing, setting the stage for a lifelong commitment to working with disabled skiers.

After the war, the Frasers moved to Vancouver, Washington. She finally got her chance to compete in Winter Olympics in 1948.  A week before her 29th birthday, Fraser won the gold medal in the slalom and a silver medal in the combined event in St. Moritz, 

She soon retired from competition, became a mother and an ambassador for Sun Valley and skiing in general. Later in life she was a mentor to aspiring female ski racers at Sun Valley, including Susie Corrock, Christin Cooper, Picabo Street, Andrea Mead Lawrence, and disabled racer Muffy Davis.

Death
She died at age 75 in February 1994, during the Winter Olympics; her husband of 54 years, Don Fraser, had died a month earlier.  They are buried at the city cemetery in Ketchum, Idaho.

Legacy
Fraser was inducted into the National Ski Hall of Fame in 1960 and the Intermountain Ski Hall of Fame in Park City in the inaugural class of 2002.
In 1960, she was inducted into the State of Washington Sports Hall of Fame and the University of Puget Sound Hall of Fame.
Gretchen's Gold, a ski run at Sun Valley's Seattle Ridge is named for her, as well as Gretchen's Restaurant in the Sun Valley Lodge.
Gretchen Fraser Neighborhood park in Vancouver, Washington, is named for her.

References

Other sources
 Allen, E. John B. (2011) Historical Dictionary of Skiing (Historical Dictionaries of Sports) 
 
 Pfeifer, Luanne (1996) Gretchen's Gold: The Story of Gretchen Fraser; America's First Gold Medallist in Olympic Skiing. Missoula, Montana: Pictorial Histories Publishing, 
 Pfeifer, Luanne (1994) "The One and Only Gretchen" Skiing Heritage Journal Vol. 6, No. 2

External links
 
 
 
 U.S. Olympic Hall of Fame - 2012 nominee, Gretchen Fraser
 Alf Engen Ski Museum - Gretchen K. Fraser
 Visit Sun Valley.com - Fun Facts, Gretchen Fraser
 Alpenglow.org - Gretchen Fraser
 Univ. of Puget Sound Hall of Fame - Gretchen Kunigk Fraser

 University of Idaho Library - teenage Gretchen Fraser running gates at Sun Valley

1919 births
1994 deaths
Sportspeople from Tacoma, Washington
American female alpine skiers
Alpine skiers at the 1948 Winter Olympics
Olympic gold medalists for the United States in alpine skiing
Olympic silver medalists for the United States in alpine skiing
People from Sun Valley, Idaho
University of Puget Sound alumni
American people of Norwegian descent
American people of German descent
Medalists at the 1948 Winter Olympics
20th-century American women
20th-century American people